{{DISPLAYTITLE:C9H10O3}}
The molecular formula C9H10O3 may refer to:

 Apocynin, a natural phenol
 Caffeyl alcohol, a natural phenol
 Dimethoxybenzaldehydes
 2,4-Dimethoxybenzaldehyde, a reagent used to specifically quantify phlorotannins
 2,5-Dimethoxybenzaldehyde
 3,4-Dimethoxybenzaldehyde (veratraldehyde)
 2-Ethoxybenzoic acid
 Ethylparaben
 Ethyl salicylate
 Ethylvanillin
 Methyl anisate
 Paeonol, a natural phenol
 Phloretic acid, a phenylpropanoid
 Tropic acid